Karpooram is a 1967 Indian Tamil-language film directed by C. N. Shanmugham. The film stars A. V. M. Rajan and Pushpalatha. It was released on 9 December 1967, and won the Filmfare Award for Best Tamil Film, while Rajan won the Tamil Nadu State Film Award for Best Actor.

Plot

Cast 
 A. V. M. Rajan as Manikkam
 Pushpalatha
 Srikanth as Muthu
 Manimala as Rajathi
 T. P. Muthulakshmi
 T. S. Balaiah

Production 
Karpooram was directed by C. N. Shanmugham, who also wrote the screenplay. It was produced by V. T. Arasu under Shashti Films. Cinematography was by Vinodhan, and the editing by Govindaswami.

Soundtrack 
The soundtrack of the film was composed by D. B. Ramachandra and were lyrics written by Vidvan V. Lakshmanan, Mayavanathan & Poovai Senguttuvan.

Release and reception 
Karpooram was released on 9 December 1967. Kalki appreciated the film for its dialogues and cast performances. It won the Filmfare Award for Best Tamil Film.

References

External links 
 

1960s Tamil-language films
1967 drama films
1967 films
Indian drama films